Innoko can refer to the:
Holikachuk people
Innoko River
Innoko National Wildlife Refuge